Mark Kjeldsen (1953 in Kent, England – 1992) was a founder member of The Sinceros (1978–1981), who wrote most of the songs on their two albums, including their minor hit single "Take Me To Your Leader."  He had been a member of the London R&B band, The Strutters. After the demise of The Sinceros, Kjeldsen (pronounced Kelsen) performed with the Danny Adler Band (ex-Roogalator), a live album featuring Kjeldsen on rhythm guitar was recorded at the Winterthur – Switzerland on 10 August 1982 and released in 1983. In the late 1980s, Kjeldsen gave up music to become a social worker and died from AIDS in 1992.

His musical career started after leaving Tonbridge School when he formed folk duo Friendso'mine with fellow musician Hugh Trethowan. Together they toured the folk clubs of Kent and London culminating in an album of their own material for Westwood Recordings in 1972.

References
 Colin Larkin, The Guinness Encyclopedia of Popular Music – Page 3578, Guinness, 1995, 

1953 births
1992 deaths
AIDS-related deaths in California
British male guitarists
British male singer-songwriters
British session musicians
British people of Norwegian descent
The Sinceros members
20th-century British male singers